Aulostomoides is an extinct genus of prehistoric bony fish that lived from the early to middle Eocene.

References

Gasterosteiformes
Eocene fish
Fossils of Italy